Teen Dream was a three girl R&B and synth-pop group from Columbus, Ohio formed by producer Chris Powell in 1985. They are best recognized by their 1987 hit "Let's Get Busy" which peaked at #41 on Billboards Hot Black Singles chart. The group partnered with "Valentino", actor Michael DeLorenzo.

Throughout their journey, Teen Dream sold over 100,000 record albums worldwide and received the platinum record given by RIAA certificate as the band was popular some degree in the mid and late 1980s. They had a collaboration with other American R&B and freestyle artists of the East part of the United States, such as Expose, a freestyle band from Miami, Florida. Best known by their 1985 hit “Point of No Return”. The Mac Band, an R&B four person band from Flint, Michigan that is merely recognized by their 1988 single “Roses Are Red”. Lisa Lisa & Cult Jam, another freestyle R&B band from New York City. Last but not least, The Jets (band) that originated in Minneapolis Minnesota best known by their 1987 hit on the Beverly Hills Cop Soundtrack “Cross My Broken Heart” became the prominent figure group among the R&B artists of the 1980s. Every one of these bands played at the same music venue on many occasions that had a big percentage rise in the whole entire R&B and freestyle music industry. Teen Dream Band only became a minor R&B group in the United States and played live three times at different music scenes, although it was possible that they were mainstream overseas but therefore the band did not increase potential fame at the edge of becoming very popular. In 1988, Teen Dream was dropped from Warner Bros. and Terri left the group, Chris Powell insisted on keeping the group going, so he recruited two new girls to replace Terri (including Tia Stewart) and got them signed to a new record label with the Muscle Shoals Sound Records label in 1989 “Games” which flunked the charts which made the band have zero decency before their 1990 disastrous breakup. By that point, there was only one member from the previous lineup remaining. Since then, it seems as if though Teen Dream faded into obscurity.

Terri Whitlow now runs her own band “Terri Whitlow and the show.” She still resides herself in Columbus, Ohio with her family.

Lisa Jackson is a Senior Manager of Accounting Services for The Davey Tree Expert Company in Cleveland, Ohio.

Nikki Cooper still remains unknown what she's doing now these days.

Chris Powell “The Mentor” still runs and opens up new groups out of Columbus, Ohio.

Members
Terri Whitlow - lead vocals
Lisa Jackson - vocals
Nikki Cooper - vocals, synthesizer, keyboards
Benny Medina - producer, all instruments
Dan Hargrove - producer, keyboards, all instruments
Chris Powell - executive producer, all instruments

Discography
”Let's Get Busy” 1986 
”Toy” 1987
”I Hear Talk” 1987
”Games” 1989
”Everybody Is Somebody” (from the soundtrack Lean on Me, featuring Riff and Taja Sevelle), 1989

References

American contemporary R&B musical groups
American girl groups
Musical groups from Columbus, Ohio